Rainer Hinteregger (16 February 1944 – 12 January 1982) was an Austrian rower. He competed in the men's coxed pair event at the 1972 Summer Olympics.

References

1944 births
1982 deaths
Austrian male rowers
Olympic rowers of Austria
Rowers at the 1972 Summer Olympics
Place of birth missing